Délembé is a village in Vakaga, Central African Republic.

History 
During Central African Republic Bush War, UFDR captured Délembé on 31 October 2006. They looted hospitals and killed five civilians, two of them were children.

In 2009, 34 houses were burned in Délembé following the death of young Gula men by crucifixion.

Demography 
Kara makes up the majority of Délembé's population.

Facilities 
Délembé has one public health post and one school.

References 

Populated places in Vakaga